Beatrice Lumpkin ( Shapiro; born August 3, 1918) is an American union organizer, activist, professor, and writer. She is a member of the Communist Party and the Chicago Teachers Union, as well as an organizer for several other unions. She was a tenured professor at Malcolm X College, wrote several books about history and mathematics, and is a co-founder of the Coalition of Labor Union Women.

Early life and education 
Lumpkin was born Beatrice Shapiro on August 3, 1918, in The Bronx, New York, to Morris Shapiro (born Avrom Hirschenhorn) and Dora Shapiro (born Ruhde Chernin), who were Russian immigrants of Jewish descent. They were members of the Jewish Labour Bund, a socialist organization in Russia. During the 1905 Russian Revolution, Beatrice's father was arrested and beaten, but escaped from prison and obtained a fake passport bearing his new name to move to the United States. He entered through Ellis Island and eventually settled in the Lower East Side of Manhattan. Beatrice's mother, who had helped her future husband escape, went to join him in 1906, and they were soon married. They both worked in the clothing manufacturing industry; Dora worked in Greenwich Village at the Triangle Shirtwaist Factory but was pregnant and not present during the 1911 fire at the factory. Their first child Max was born soon after, and the family moved to the Bronx where they owned and operated a laundry business.

Beatrice is the second of three children; her younger brother died when he was a child. She graduated from James Monroe High School, where she joined the National Student League and the Young Communist League USA. She then attended Hunter College to study history, earning a BA in 1939. After working as a factory worker for several years, she graduated from Northeastern Illinois State College in 1967 with an MST and from Illinois Institute of Technology in 1974 with an MS.

Career and activism 
Lumpkin's first job was as a factory worker in 1933, at the age of 14; she lied about her age so she could get a fifteen-cent-an-hour position assembling radio tubes. Soon after, she wrote her first flyer titled "Are you satisfied?" and helped organize African-American laundry workers, in Harlem and the Bronx, who were paid low-wages during the Great Depression. She joined the Metal Workers Industrial Union, later part of the Congress of Industrial Organizations. While at Hunter College, she helped organize a student strike to protest American militarism in 1935, for which she was suspended from the school. She was suspended again two years later for putting together an antifascist student conference. She was also an organizer for the Laundry Workers Industrial Union and joined the Communist Party from an early age. In 1937, she was hired by the Congress of Industrial Organizations, along with 15 others, for a campaign to organize 30,000 laundry workers into a union. She also joined marches protesting the imprisonment of the Scottsboro Nine and the Italian invasion of Ethiopia.

In 1939, after graduating from college, she moved to Brooklyn to work at a laundry and became a leader of the Local 328. She later became a radio technician at a factory and joined the United Electrical Workers. Beginning in 1942, she was an electronics technician in Buffalo, New York. During and soon after World War II, she was an activist for the renters' rights, and helped organized strikes and tenant associations. When her family was evicted during this period, the landlord told the judge about her association with the Communist Party, leading to the eviction being upheld. In the late 1940s, Lumpkin organized a committee in support of the Progressive Party candidate, Henry Wallace, the former vice president, who ran for president in the 1948 elections.

As part of the civil rights movement in 1950s and 1960s, Lumpkin protested Jim Crow laws and resisted against segregated public areas with her African-American husband, Frank Lumpkin, a fellow union organizer and member of Communist Party. In the mid-1960s, she became a Chicago Public School teacher and later joined the Crane Junior College, which became Malcolm X College, where she was as a tenured professor. She was a co-founder of the Coalition of Labor Union Women in 1974 and remains a member of the Chicago Teachers Union.

In 1979, Lumpkin wrote her first book, Senefer, A Young Genius in Old Egypt, a children's book about an Egyptian mathematician. She late wrote, Always Bring a Crowd!: The Story of Frank Lumpkin, Steelworker (1999), a memoir of her husband's 17-year legal battle to restore the lost pensions and wages of 3,000 of his co-workers at the Wisconsin Steel plant in South Side which closed down in 1980. In 2013, she wrote an autobiography, Joy in the Struggle: My Life and Love.

In 2016, Lumpkin helped found Intergen, an inter-generational and multi-racial activist alliance.

Personal life 
Beatrice married her first husband, Roderick Mohrherr, sometime before the end of World War II in 1945; they were divorced in 1947 after having two children, Carl Joseph and Jeanleah. On October 22, 1949, she married Frank Lumpkin with whom she had two more children, Paul David and John Robert. Her second husband was an African-American steel worker and union organizer, with whom she moved to Gary, Indiana, in the 1950s and settled in Chicago in 1962. As an interracial couple, they were met with hostility and discrimination both in New York and Chicago. Frank died on March 1, 2010.

In the reference book series Contemporary Authors, she listed hiking and traveling as her hobbies and the Golden Rule as her religion. Both she and Frank considered themselves humanists.

Lumpkin says she voted in every US presidential election since 1940. In October 2020, she made headlines in several publications when she donned personal protective equipment modeled after a hazmat suit while dropping her vote-by-mail ballot for the year's elections held during the COVID-19 pandemic.

Bibliography

References 

1918 births
20th-century American educators
20th-century American women writers
21st-century American women writers
Activists from New York City
American autobiographers
American centenarians
American communists
American humanists
American people of Russian-Jewish descent
American women academics
Chicago Teachers Union people
Hunter College alumni
Illinois Institute of Technology alumni
Jewish American academics
Jewish American activists
American trade union leaders
Living people
Members of the Communist Party USA
Northeastern Illinois University alumni
Schoolteachers from Illinois
20th-century American women educators
Women autobiographers
Women centenarians
Writers from the Bronx